Tinkisso is a village in the Dinguiraye Prefecture of Guinea. The Tinkisso River and dam is important to the local economy. The economy is based on mining and agriculture.

References

Ramsar sites in Guinea

Populated places in the Faranah Region